Lake Foy Sagar is an artificial lake situated near Ajmer in the state of Rajasthan, India.  It is named after the engineer Mr. Foy, an Englishman, who created it under a famine relief project in 1892.  He created it to tackle with harshest conditions of famine under a famine relief project. It appears flat, and offers views of the neighboring Aravalli mountains. The lake is among the tourist spots of the city.

At the time when the lake was constructed, the city of Ajmer was known as Ajmere, as can be noticed from the inscription installed at the lake.

List of Lake in India
List of lakes in India

Foy Sagar
Tourist attractions in Ajmer
Foy Sagar